Saint John the Baptist as a Boy is an oil on panel painting by Andrea del Sarto, executed c. 1525, now in the Palatine Gallery of the Palazzo Pitti in Florence.

Vasari's Lives of the Artists mentions two works by Andrea del Sarto showing half-length figures of John the Baptist as a boy. This is the first of the two, produced for Giovan Maria Benintendi. The second was intended for the Grand Master of France, but was later sold to Ottaviano de' Medici instead and may be the one now in the Worcester Art Museum.

The Palatine Gallery work was the central one in the decoration of the antechamber in the Palazzo Benintendi. The other works in the antechamber were Pontormo's Adoration of the Magi, Franciabigio's Bathsheba Bathing (Gemäldegalerie, Dresden) and Bacchiacca's Legend of the Dead King's Son (Gemäldegalerie, Dresden) and Baptism of Christ (Gemäldegalerie, Berlin).  

The work was later given to Cosimo I by Giovanni Maria Benintendi. It is recorded as hanging in the Guardaroba Medicea in 1553, along with its donor's name. It appears in a Medici inventory of 1589 and hung in the Palatine Gallery's Jupiter room from at least 1828 and possibly earlier.

References

1523 paintings
Paintings by Andrea del Sarto
Paintings in the collection of the Galleria Palatina
Paintings depicting John the Baptist